The San Francisco Vikings Soccer Club is a soccer club in San Francisco, California.  Founded in 1922 the club is involved in all playing levels from the under 5 years-old microsoccer program, the various recreational and competitive youth programs, the men's team in the San Francisco Soccer Football League,  through the stumblers senior program.

History
The Vikings Soccer Club began in the Fall of 1922 with a group of senior players.  They were the charter members of all the local and state soccer organizations: the California Soccer Association - North (Cal North Soccer),  the SFSFL  and the United States Youth Soccer Association.

Ernie Feibusch and his brother played for the early Vikings and continues his involvement to this day.   Mr Feibusch serves on the Board of Directors, provides SF with referee and coaching courses, plays on Sundays with the stumblers (a program where everyone, young and old, can play), and also coaches the U-19 level.  Ernie Feibusch was inducted into the National Soccer Hall of Fame in 1984.

The Vikings developed a youth program in 1939 under the leadership of the late Derk Zylker, Sr.  Unfortunately, World War II intruded and the program did not get under way again until 1952.  The Vikings also were the first Club to foster the Under 8 and Under 10 year-old program in 1974. The club also piloted the Under 5 Microsoccer program.

Organization

Select teams

The Vikings Club runs a select team program, which includes CYSA Gold, Silver Elite, Silver, Bronze & Copper "travel" teams that play in the CYSA Cal Soccer League against travel teams from other soccer clubs in Northern California, and CCSL Prep teams that play in the Vikings CCSL Prep League.   
The Vikings Club has sent many players to the Olympic Development Program over the years.

Men's team
The Vikings men's team is coached by Pat Cadam and plays in the Premier Division of the SFSFL.

Recreation League
The club has a recreational league for Under 15 to Under 18 players who want to continue to play soccer after they age out of the Vikings League but do not want to commit to a Select Team.

Microsoccer
The club runs the pioneering Microsoccer program.  Microsoccer is a fall and spring program for Under 5 through Under 7 players just learning to play soccer.

Summer Camps
The club runs summer camps for players from age 5 to age 12; Elite Skills Camps focused on striker, defender and goalie training for players from age 11 to age 15; and a fall and spring 7 v 7 camp.

References

Links
 San Francisco Vikings Soccer Club

Vikings
Association football clubs established in 1922